India: The Emerging Giant is a 2008 book by Arvind Panagariya which describes the contemporary state of the economy of India.

Synopsis by chapter
Each chapter has a main topic and a set of essays on different aspects of that main topic.

Growth and Economic Reforms

Distinguishing Four Phases
This chapter is divided into these parts:
Phase I (1951–65): Takeoff under a Liberal Regime
Phase II (1965–81): Socialism Strikes with a Vengeance
Phase III (1981–88): Liberalization by Stealth
Phase IV (1988-2006): Triumph of Liberalization
A Tale of two Countries:India and the Republic of Korea

Poverty, Inequality, and Economic Reforms
This chapter is divided into these parts:
Declining Poverty: The Human Face of Reforms
Inequality: A Lesser Problem

Macroeconomics
This chapter is divided into these parts:
Deficits and Debt: Is a Crisis around the Corner?
The External Sector: On the Road to Capital Account Convertibility?
The Financial Sector: Why Not Privatize the Banks?

Transforming India
This chapter is divided into these parts:
International Trade: Carrying Liberalization Forward
Industry and Services: Walking on Two Legs
Modernizing Agriculture

The Government
This chapter is divided into these parts:
Tax Reform: Toward a Uniform Goods and Services Tax
Tackling Subsidies and Reforming the Civil Service
Telecommunications and Electricity: Contrasting Experiences
Transportation: A Solvable Problem
Health and Water Supply and Sanitation: Can the Government Deliver?
Education: Expenditures or Transfers?

Reviews
Nandan Nilekani said that in this book the author has "so convincingly argued (that) open policies and rapid economic growth are the best antidotes for poverty reduction."

The review in Foreign Affairs said, "This is a massive research study that will command the respect of scholars who like to pore over tables, graphs, and charts in search of patterns and connections in the data."

Economist Sally Razeen said that by this book, "Arvind Panagariya has written probably the best all-around, up-to-date, and accessible book on the Indian economy."

References

External links

author's video presentation on book

Indian non-fiction books
Oxford University Press books
Books about globalization
Books about the economy of India